David Oh may refer to:

 David Oh, American politician from Philadelphia
 David Oh (golfer), American professional golfer
 David Oh (musician), Korean-American singer
David Y. Oh (engineer), American systems engineer
 Zero, real name David Oh, a character in the Metal Gear series.